Donald Rose Wright (November 24, 1929 – July 5, 2014) was an American politician from Alaska.

Early life and education
Donald Rose Wright was born in Nenana, Alaska, one of seven sons of Episcopal missionaries Arthur and Myrtle Wright. His mother was white. His father was half half Gwich'in and half white, with familial origins in Old Crow, Yukon, and was one of numerous Alaska Natives recruited for and mentored in the ministry by Episcopal bishop Peter Trimble Rowe. As a missionary family, they lived all over Interior Alaska, but mostly in Nenana, Minto and Fairbanks. He graduated from Fairbanks High School in 1947.

Career
Wright was a former president of the Alaska Federation of Natives, serving from 1970 to 1972 during the height of activity over passage of the Alaska Native Claims Settlement Act. Most of his notoriety in Alaskan politics has come as a perennial candidate for statewide office in Alaska over several decades. Wright has run for statewide office in Alaska fifteen times between 1968 and 2010, eleven of those times for governor of Alaska. Of his gubernatorial campaigns, he was most notable as the gubernatorial nominee of the Alaskan Independence Party in 1978, 2002, 2006 and 2010. The 1978 campaign was the only time in the party's early history in which party founder Joe Vogler was not the gubernatorial nominee (Vogler ran for lieutenant governor instead in this election).

In addition to serving as president of AFN, he also served as president of the Bartlett Democratic Club and of the Cook Inlet Native Association.  Besides multiple runs for office under the AIP banner, he has also run for office numerous times as both a Democrat and Republican.  Wright also ran for the Republican nomination for president of the United States in 1988.  Wright ran his 2010 campaign without a running mate.

Notable family
His younger brother Jules served one term in the Alaska House of Representatives as a Republican from 1967 to 1969. Another brother, Gareth, also ran for office, but was better known as the patriarch of a family of sprint dog mushers and as a frequent rival to George Attla in numerous races over the years. This rivalry was featured in the 1979 movie Spirit of the Wind. Don Wright is the great-uncle of Ramy Brooks, a dog musher who has been active in long-distance dog racing since the 1990s.

Death
Wright died on July 5, 2014 in Kenai, Alaska.

References

1929 births
2014 deaths
20th-century American politicians
21st-century American politicians
20th-century Native Americans
21st-century Native Americans
Alaska Democrats
Alaska Native activists
Alaska Republicans
Alaskan Athabaskan people
Alaskan Independence Party politicians
American people of Canadian descent
Candidates in the 1988 United States presidential election
Dog mushers from Alaska
Gwich'in people
Native American politicians
Politicians from Anchorage, Alaska
Politicians from Fairbanks, Alaska
People from Kenai Peninsula Borough, Alaska
People from Nenana, Alaska
People from Wasilla, Alaska